Toms Skujiņš (born 15 June 1991) is a Latvian professional road racing cyclist, who currently rides for UCI WorldTeam .

Career
In 2013 and 2015, Skujiņš received the Cyclist of the Year award presented by Latvian Cycling Federation.

In 2014, Skujiņš dominated the Canadian race Tour de Beauce, winning its queen stage atop Mont Mégantic and the last stage. He was the victor of the general classification and also brought home the points classification and young rider classification jerseys.

He also took the race leader and mountains leader jerseys, which he would hold until the time trial. He would go on to win the 2015 UCI America Tour.

He was named in the start list for the 2017 Vuelta a España. In July 2018, he was named in the start list for the Tour de France. He took the polka dot jersey as the leader of the mountains classification following the fifth stage, which he held for five days. He won the combativity award on the fifth stage in both 2018 and 2019.

Skujiņš finished second on the eighth stage of the 2020 Tour de France after spending the day in a breakaway. He also rode as a domestique for team leaders Richie Porte and Bauke Mollema, with Porte ultimately finishing third overall in the race.

Personal life
Skujiņš is engaged to former professional cyclist Abigail Mickey.

Major results

2010
 1st Stage 1 Tour de Moselle
 2nd Tartu GP
 3rd Time trial, National Under-23 Road Championships
 3rd Memorial Oleg Dyachenko
 5th Overall Tour du Gévaudan Languedoc-Roussillon
 6th Paris–Tours Espoirs
 7th Overall Cinturó de l'Empordà
 7th Mayor Cup
 7th Coupe des Carpathes
 8th ZLM Tour
2011
 2nd Ronde van Vlaanderen U23
 3rd Time trial, National Under-23 Road Championships
 4th Classic Loire Atlantique
 8th Tallinn–Tartu GP
2012
 5th Riga Grand Prix
2013
 National Road Championships
1st  Under-23 road race
3rd Road race
 1st  Overall Course de la Paix U23
1st Stage 3
 1st Stage 2 Tour de Blida
 3rd  Road race, UEC European Under-23 Road Championships
 3rd Scandinavian Race Uppsala
 5th Road race, UCI Under-23 Road World Championships
 7th Overall Tour de Guadeloupe
 7th Ronde van Vlaanderen U23
 8th Ringerike GP
 9th Overall Tour de l'Avenir
 9th Hadeland GP
 10th Overall Tour of Norway
2014
 1st  Overall Tour de Beauce
1st  Points classification
1st  Young rider classification
1st Stages 2 & 5
 6th Philadelphia International Championship
2015
 1st Overall UCI America Tour
 1st Winston-Salem Cycling Classic
 1st Stage 3 Tour of California
 2nd Overall Tour de Beauce
 2nd The Reading 120
 3rd Philadelphia International Cycling Classic
 4th Course de Solidarność et des Champions Olympiques
 7th Overall Tour of Alberta
 8th Overall USA Pro Cycling Challenge
2016
 1st Stage 5 Tour of California
 National Road Championships
3rd Road race
3rd Time trial
2017
 2nd Time trial, National Road Championships
 2nd Overall Settimana Internazionale di Coppi e Bartali
1st Stage 2
 10th GP Miguel Induráin
2018
 1st  Time trial, National Road Championships
 1st Tre Valli Varesine
 1st Trofeo Lloseta–Andratx
 Tour of California
1st  Mountains classification
1st Stage 3
 7th Grote Prijs Jef Scherens
 8th Overall Colorado Classic
 Tour de France
Held  after Stages 5–9
 Combativity award Stage 5
2019
 1st  Road race, National Road Championships
 3rd Tre Valli Varesine
 9th Strade Bianche
 10th Overall Deutschland Tour
  Combativity award Stage 5 Tour de France
2021
 National Road Championships
1st  Road race
1st  Time trial
 5th Overall Vuelta a Andalucía
 5th Brabantse Pijl
2022
 1st  Time trial, National Road Championships
 1st  Mountains classification, Tour de Romandie
 4th Maryland Cycling Classic
 5th Binche–Chimay–Binche
 7th Clásica de San Sebastián
 8th Overall Tour Poitou-Charentes en Nouvelle-Aquitaine
 9th Overall Étoile de Bessèges
 9th Bretagne Classic

General classification results timeline

Classics results timeline

Major championships timeline

References

External links
 
 
 
 
 
 
 
 
 
 

1991 births
Living people
Latvian male cyclists
Olympic cyclists of Latvia
Cyclists at the 2016 Summer Olympics
Cyclists at the 2020 Summer Olympics
European Games competitors for Latvia
Cyclists at the 2015 European Games
People from Sigulda
Riga State Gymnasium No.1 alumni